Spain is an unincorporated community in Marshall County, in the U.S. state of South Dakota.

History
A post office called Spain was established in 1888, and remained in operation until 1942. According to the Federal Writers' Project, the origin of the name Spain is obscure.

References

Unincorporated communities in Marshall County, South Dakota
Unincorporated communities in South Dakota